İdil is a feminine Turkish given name and a feminine Somali given name. İdil means Volga in Turkic languages, referring to the river in Europe and the name of a district in Turkey. 

In Somali, Idil means "complete" in the context of perfection. Contrary to popular belief, The Turkish and Somali forms of the name do not share the same root.

People named İdil or Idil include:
 İdil Biret (born 1941), Turkish concert pianist
 İdil Fırat (born 1972), Turkish actress
 Idil Hiloule, Somali filmmaker
 İdil Üner (born 1971), German-Turkish actress

See also
İdil, district of Şırnak Province

Turkish feminine given names